Tolidopalpus bimaculatus is a beetle in the genus Tolidopalpus of the family Mordellidae. It was described in 1997 by Shiyake.

References

Mordellidae
Beetles described in 1997